"My Kinda Lover" is a rock song written and performed by American hard rock singer and guitarist Billy Squier. It was the third and final single released from his Triple Platinum 1981 album Don't Say No, following "In the Dark".

Record World said that "While his band spanks, crunches and crashes, Billy seduces with a light. likeable tenor."

It peaked at number 45 on the United States Billboard Hot 100, and number 43 on the Cash Box Top 100 chart in early 1982. It also reached number 31 on Billboard Hot Mainstream Rock Tracks chart.

Charts

Later uses
Rapper Eminem sampled "My Kinda Lover" on his 2014 song "Shady XV".
The song was used in the Mötley Crüe biopic, The Dirt, when lead singer Vince Neil is performing it with a cover band at a party when Tommy, Mick, and Nikki arrive to recruit Neil into the band.

References

External links
 

1981 singles
Billy Squier songs
Songs written by Billy Squier
Song recordings produced by Reinhold Mack
1981 songs
Capitol Records singles